Godfrey Acheson Thornhagh Foljambe  (21 October 1869 – 16 March 1942) was an English first-class cricketer.

The son of Francis Foljambe and his wife, Gertrude Emily Acheson, Foljambe was born at Marylebone in October 1869. He was educated at Eton College, before going up to Trinity College, Cambridge, where he graduated in 1892. He made his debut in first-class cricket for the Marylebone Cricket Club (MCC) against Cambridge University at Fenner's in 1892. He toured Ceylon and India with Lord Hawke's XI in 1892–93, making three first-class appearances on the tour. He made his final first-class appearance in May 1893 for the MCC against Cambridge University. In his five first-class matches, Foljambe scored 97 runs with a high score of 34. With his left-arm medium pace bowling, he took 9 wickets at an average of 16.11, with best figures of 4 for 32. In addition to playing first-class cricket, he also played minor counties cricket for Cambridgeshire in 1899, making a single appearance in the Minor Counties Championship. 

He later served as a justice of the peace for Herefordshire. Foljambe died in March 1942 at Lizard, Cornwall. He was married to Judith Frances Wright, the daughter of FitzHerbert Wright. His brother George was also a first-class cricketer, as were his uncles Edward Acheson and Lord Acheson.

References

External links

1869 births
1942 deaths
People from Marylebone
People educated at Eton College
Alumni of Trinity College, Cambridge
English cricketers
Marylebone Cricket Club cricketers
Lord Hawke's XI cricketers
Cambridgeshire cricketers
English justices of the peace